Ravilops is a genus of Thelyphonid whip scorpions, first described by Víquez and Armas in 2005.

Species 
, the World Uropygi Catalog accepts the following two species:

 Ravilops kovariki Teruel, 2017 – Dominican Republic
 Ravilops wetherbeei (Armas, 2002) – Dominican Republic

References 

Arachnid genera
Uropygi